Annette Kennedy is an Irish nurse and Past President of the International Council of Nurses from 2017 to 2021.

Biography
Annette Kennedy is an Irish nurse. She completed her BA in Nursing Studies and followed it up with an MSc in Public Sector Analysis. Kennedy was given an Honorary Fellowship from the Royal College of Surgeons in Ireland. For 19 years, from 1994 through 2012, she worked as the director of the Irish Nurses and Midwives Organisation. She founded their Education, Research and Resource Centre. Kennedy was President of the European Federation of Nurses. She was elected vice-president of the ICN and held the position for four years before going on to become 28th President of the International Council of Nurses in 2017. Kennedy also worked as a Commissioner for the WHO Independent High –Level Commission on non-communicable diseases for two years.

Sources

Living people
Irish nurses
Year of birth missing (living people)